Bätzing is a German surname. Notable people with the surname include:

 Georg Bätzing (born 1961), German Roman Catholic bishop
 Sabine Bätzing-Lichtenthäler (born 1975), German politician

German-language surnames